British Library, Add MS 14453, designated by number 66 on the list of Wright, is a Syriac manuscript of the New Testament, on parchment, according to the Peshitta version. Palaeographically it has been assigned to the 5th or 6th century. The manuscript is lacunose. Gregory labelled it by 15e.

Description 

The original codex contained the text of the 22 books of Peshitta translation of the New Testament, on 182 parchment leaves (25 by 20 cm), with only one  lacuna at the beginning and end. The Gospel of Matthew begins in 6:25, the Gospel of John ends in 20:25. Written in one column per page, in 22-27 lines per page. The writing is a large, regular Estrangela. Folio 173 was repaired with paper about the 12th century.

History of the manuscript 

Formerly it belonged to the monastery of St. Mary Deipara in the Wadi El Natrun. In 1842 it was brought to England, with the other 500 manuscripts. The manuscript was examined and described by Wright.

The manuscript is housed at the British Library (Add MS 14453) in London.

See also 

 List of the Syriac New Testament manuscripts
 Syriac versions of the Bible
 Biblical manuscript
 Codex Phillipps 1388
 British Library, Add MS 14448

References

Further reading 

 William Wright, Catalogue of Syriac manuscripts in the British museum acquired since the year 1838, pp. 44–45

Peshitta manuscripts
5th-century biblical manuscripts
Add. 14453